Turn It Up is the debut studio album by English singer Pixie Lott, released on 11 September 2009 by Mercury Records. The album's first two singles, "Mama Do (Uh Oh, Uh Oh)" and "Boys and Girls", both topped the UK Singles Chart, while subsequent singles "Cry Me Out", "Gravity" and "Turn It Up" all reached the top 20. Turn It Up peaked at number six on the UK Albums Chart and was certified double Platinum by the British Phonographic Industry, with sales in excess of 600,000 copies.

The album was re-released as Turn It Up Louder on 18 October 2010. It was preceded by the release of "Broken Arrow" as its lead single, and includes nine other bonus songs. In 2010, it was reported that Interscope Records was planning to release Turn It Up in the United States with new songs in early 2011, which never materialised.

Singles
"Mama Do (Uh Oh, Uh Oh)" was released on 3 June 2009 as the album's lead single. It debuted at number one on the UK Singles Chart, making Lott the second British female solo artist to have a debut single enter atop the chart without previously appearing on a reality television show, after Billie Piper.

Follow-up single "Boys and Girls" was released on 5 September 2009, a week before the album's release. The song debuted at number 73 on the UK Singles Chart before climbing to number one the following week, earning Lott her second consecutive chart-topper and breaking the record of the biggest leap to the top position in the UK chart history.

"Cry Me Out", released as the third single on 30 November 2009, peaked at number 12 on the UK chart, Lott's first single to miss the top 10.

"Gravity" was released as the album's fourth single on 8 March 2010. It charted at number 20 in the UK, making it her fourth consecutive top-20 single.

"Turn It Up" was released as the fifth single on 7 June 2010, for which a music video, directed by Nick Frew, was shot in Los Angeles on 17 April 2010. The single became her fifth consecutive top-20 entry when it peaked at number 11 on the UK Singles Chart.

"Broken Arrow" was released on 10 October 2010 as the only single (sixth overall) from the Turn It Up Louder reissue. The music video was directed by Gregg Masuak, and premiered on 16 September 2010. The single reached number 12 on the UK chart, giving Lott her sixth consecutive top-20 single.

Although it was initially suggested that "Coming Home", a collaboration with American R&B singer Jason Derulo, was originally going to serve as the second single from Turn It Up Louder after it debuted at number 51 on the UK Singles Chart, Lott later confirmed on her official Twitter page that she was filming a video for "Can't Make This Over". The video premiered on 25 November 2010, but the single release was ultimately cancelled.

Critical reception

Turn It Up received mixed reviews from music critics. At Metacritic, which assigns a weighted mean rating out of 100 to reviews from mainstream critics, the album received an average score of 51, based on eight reviews, which indicates "mixed or average reviews". Paul Lester of BBC Music described the album as a "classy, if not classic, debut from potential-rich pop newcomer" and stated that the songs on the album "do indeed sound as though they could be farmed out to other RnB starlets. That's a compliment as much as it is a criticism: from the 1960s soul stomp of her number one hit 'Mama Do (Uh Oh, Uh Oh)' to new single 'Boys & Girls' with its brassy Mark Ronson-esque production, some of the material here lacks character." Stephen Thomas Erlewine of AllMusic wrote, "Despite this fondness for swinging girl group sounds and Pixie's predilection for belting out the songs, Turn It Up doesn't play as a retro-soul throwback, the way Winehouse or Duffy do. Lott never attempts to seem wiser than her years, [...] and the production is wisely, slyly modern."

Digital Spy music editor Nick Levine commented that "Turn It Up is never dull—Lott has too much natural exuberance for that—but it's a little safe and lacking in surprises", citing "Gravity", "Turn It Up" and "Here We Go Again" as highlights. Dan Cairns of The Sunday Times opined that "[b]ar two missteps ('My Love' and 'Nothing Compares'), Turn It Up is superior, infectious, expertly tailored pop that, had it been recorded 30 or so years ago, would very likely now be being praised to the heavens in reissue sections." Dan Gennoe of Yahoo! Music noted that "[t]he sass, swagger, killer hooks and big production have been focused on the obvious chart contenders and the rest of the album is, true to tradition, a lot of middle of the road balladry and overly earnest swaying, also known as filler." Daily Express reviewer Robert Spellman felt that the single "Mama Do (Uh Oh, Uh Oh)" "promised what the album hasn't delivered, a sort sultry self-confidence with a pinch of the wreckless [sic] that would do Lady Gaga proud", adding that "corny power ballads such as 'Cry Me Out' and too much half-baked R&B mistakenly attempt to give Pixie depth when she—or rather her writers—should be gunning for surface only." The Daily Telegraphs Helen Brown referred to Lott as "[f]un and feisty but hard to distinguish from the rest of this year's girl pop pack." In a review for musicOMH, Michael Cragg dismissed the album as "a fairly average pop album being strangled by a talented vocalist who equates loudness with emotion." Imogen Carter of The Observer compared the album to a "Disney teen-movie soundtrack", calling it "cloying and cliche-ridden, particularly the slow numbers."

Commercial performance
Turn It Up debuted at number six on the UK Albums Chart, selling 25,652 copies in its first week. Following the album's re-release Turn It Up Louder on 18 October 2010, it rose from number 29 to number nine on 24 October with 15,114 copies sold. On 13 August 2010, the album was certified double Platinum by the British Phonographic Industry (BPI). In Ireland, Turn It Up debuted and peaked at number 18 on the Irish Albums Chart for the week ending 17 September 2009.

The album saw modest success across continental Europe, reaching number 16 in Denmark, number 24 on the European Top 100 Albums chart, number 49 in Switzerland, number 60 in France, number 70 in Austria and Belgium's Wallonia, number 81 in Germany, number 92 in the Netherlands and number 99 in Belgium's Flanders. In Oceania, it peaked at number eight on the Australian Hitseekers Albums Chart and at number 30 in New Zealand.

Track listing

Notes
  signifies an additional producer
  signifies an extra vocal producer
  signifies a vocal producer
 "Coming Home" incorporates elements of "(I Just) Died in Your Arms" by Cutting Crew.
 The enhanced CD includes a link to a bonus area on Push Entertainment, which can only be accessed by inserting the CD into a computer's CD/DVD drive, featuring videos of "Boys and Girls" and "Mama Do (Uh Oh, Uh Oh)" to watch online, and to download for free.
 CD pressings of Turn It Up Louder prior to November 2010 and its iTunes release contain the album version of "Turn It Up".

Personnel
Credits adapted from the liner notes of Turn It Up.

Musicians

 Pixie Lott vocals ; background vocals 
 Mads Hauge drums, keyboards ; bass, guitar, programming ; background vocals ; Wurlitzer 
 Phil Thornalley drums ; piano ; glockenspiel ; guitar 
 Anders Kallmark synthesiser 
 John Thirkell trumpet, flugelhorn 
 Phil Smith tenor saxophone, baritone saxophone 
 Sally Herbert string arrangements, conducting 
 Everton Nelson violin 
 Richard George violin 
 Emlyn Singleton violin 
 Julia Singleton violin 
 Jackie Norrie violin 
 Rick Koster violin 
 Calina de la Mare violin 
 Bruce White viola 
 Claire Orsler viola 
 Clare Finnimore viola 
 Ian Burdge cello 
 Chris Worsey cello 
 Jon Green guitar, piano 
 David Tench Wurlitzer 
 Toby Gad all instruments, arrangement ; guitars, bass 
 Jonas Jeberg all instruments ; all other instruments 
 Mich Hansen percussion 
 Ina Wroldsen background vocals 
 Daniel Davidsen guitar 
 Warren Zielinski violin 
 Brian Wright violin 
 Natalia Bonner violin 
 Nick Barr viola 
 Sophie Harris cello 
 Peter Zizzo background vocals ; arrangement, instrumental programming 
 Marion Raven background vocals 
 Miklós Malek additional synth programming 
 Kaci Brown all background vocals, arrangement 
 Jens Gad drums 
 Rich Adam additional programming 
 RedOne all instruments, instrumental programming, vocal arrangement 
 Johnny Severin electric guitar 

Technical

 Mads Hauge production, recording engineering ; Pro Tools 
 Phil Thornalley production 
 Chris Sansom additional engineering 
 Greg Kurstin additional production 
 Phil Tan mixing 
 Carlos Oyanedel additional mix engineering 
 Tom Coyne mastering 
 Graham Linehy string recording 
 Toby Gad production 
 Tony Maserati mixing 
 Marc Burkhart recording engineering assistance 
 Geoff Pesche mastering engineering 
 Jonas Jeberg production 
 Cutfather production 
 Fraser T. Smith additional production, additional mix 
 Beatriz Artola engineering 
 Mo Hausler string recording 
 Peter Zizzo production, recording 
 Jeremy Wheatley mixing 
 Jens Gad drum recording 
 RedOne production, vocal editing, recording, engineering 
 Johnny Severin vocal editing, recording, engineering 
 Robert Orton mixing 
 Ryan Laubscher production 
 Mads Nilsson mixing 
 Louis Odunoye mixing assistance 

Artwork
 Sandrine Dulermo photography
 Michael Labica photography
 Paul West design
 Joe Wassell-Smith design assistance

Turn It Up Louder
Credits adapted from the liner notes of Turn It Up Louder.

Musicians

 Pixie Lott vocals ; background vocals 
 Al Shux guitar 
 Jon Green piano, tack piano, glockenspiel 
 Tom Meadows drums 
 Mads Hauge guitar, background vocals, programming, arrangement 
 Phil Thornalley glockenspiel, programming 
 Everton Nelson violin leader 
 Warren Zielinski violin 
 Bruce White viola 
 Ian Burdge cello 
 Sally Herbert arrangement 
 Harvey Mason Jr. music 
 Andrew Hey guitar 
 Rob Knox drum programming 
 RedOne all instruments, instrumental programming, vocal arrangement 
 Johnny Severin electric guitar 
 Deekay arrangement 
 Tim McEwan all instruments 
 Obi all instruments 
 Josh all instruments 
 Lars Jensen additional percussion 
 Martin Larsson additional keys 
 Toby Gad instruments, arrangement 
 Mark Pusey drums 
 Oliver Weeks keyboards 
 Jay Reynolds programming 
 Jason Derulo background vocals 
 Victoria Akintola background vocals 
 Sirach "Angel" Charles background vocals 
 John Shanks guitars, bass 
 Charles Judge keyboards 
 Dan Chase keyboards, programming 
 Eve Nelson keyboards 
 Jeff Rothschild programming 
 Teemu Brunila piano 
 Fabien Waltmann programming 
 Paul Canning background vocals 
 Marli Harwood background vocals 

Technical

 Mark Bishop recording 
 Phil Thornalley production 
 Mads Hauge production 
 Harvey Mason Jr. production 
 Andrew Hey recording 
 David Boyd recording, mixing assistance 
 Dabling Harward recording 
 Dave Russell mixing 
 Michael Daley mixing assistance 
 Angela N. Golightly production coordination 
 RedOne production, vocal editing, recording, engineering 
 Johnny Severin vocal editing, recording, engineering 
 Robert Orton mixing 
 Deekay production, mixing 
 Toby Gad production, recording 
 Jay Reynolds additional production ; production ; mixing 
 James F. Reynolds production, mixing ; additional production, mix 
 Zach Hancock extra vocal production 
 Chris Braide production 
 Tim Debney mastering 
 John Shanks production 
 Jeff Rothschild recording, mixing 
 Chris Barrett additional recording 
 Shari Sutcliffe contracted production coordination 
 Fred Ball vocal production 

Artwork
 Sandrine Dulermo photography
 Michael Labica photography
 Tom Bird creative direction
 Paul West design
 Matt le Gallez design assistance

Charts

Weekly charts

Year-end charts

Certifications

|}

Release history

Notes

References

2009 debut albums
Albums produced by Greg Kurstin
Albums produced by John Shanks
Albums produced by RedOne
Albums produced by Toby Gad
Mercury Records albums
Pixie Lott albums